Firebrand Jordan is a 1930 American pre-Code
western film directed by Alan James and starring Lane Chandler, Sheldon Lewis and Yakima Canutt.

Cast
 Lane Chandler as 	Firebrand Jordan
 Aline Goodwin as 	Joan Howe
 Yakima Canutt as 	Red Carson
 Sheldon Lewis as 	David Hampton
 Marguerite Ainslee as Peggy Howe
 Tom London as 	Ed Burns
 Lew Meehan as 	Spike
 Frank Yaconelli as 	Tony
 Alfred Hewston as Ah Sing
 Fred Harvey as 	Judd Howe
 Cliff Lyons as 	Pete
 Thomas G. Lingham as 	Henchman

References

Bibliography
 Munden, Kenneth White. The American Film Institute Catalog of Motion Pictures Produced in the United States, Part 1. University of California Press, 1997.
 Pitts, Michael R. Poverty Row Studios, 1929–1940. McFarland & Company, 2005.

External links
 

1930 films
1930 Western (genre) films
American Western (genre) films
Films directed by Alan James
American black-and-white films
1930s English-language films
1930s American films